Mark Arnold Lomas (born June 8, 1948) is a former professional American football defensive lineman who played five seasons for the New York Jets.

External links
 Bio from 1974 Jets yearbook

1948 births
Living people
Players of American football from Los Angeles
American football defensive ends
American football defensive tackles
Northern Arizona Lumberjacks football players
New York Jets players